A skull and crossbones is a symbol consisting of a human skull and two long bones crossed together under or behind the skull. The design originated in the Late Middle Ages as a symbol of death and especially as a memento mori on tombstones.

In modern contexts, it is generally used as a hazard symbol, usually in regard to poisonous substances, such as deadly chemicals.

It is also associated with piracy and software piracy, due to its historical use in some Jolly Roger flags.

Military use 

The skull and bones are often used in military insignia, such as the coats of arms of regiments.

Symbol for poisonous substances 

 
The skull and crossbones has long been a standard symbol for poison.

In 1829, New York State required the labeling of all containers of poisonous substances. The skull and crossbones symbol appears to have been used for that purpose since the 1850s. Previously a variety of motifs had been used, including the Danish "+ + +" and drawings of skeletons.

In the 1870s poison manufacturers around the world began using bright cobalt bottles with a variety of raised bumps and designs (to enable easy recognition in the dark) to indicate poison, but by the 1880s the skull and cross bones had become ubiquitous, and the brightly coloured bottles lost their association.

In the United States, due to concerns that the skull-and-crossbones symbol's association with pirates might encourage children to play with toxic materials, the Mr. Yuk symbol was created to denote poison. However, in 2001, the American Association of Poison Control Center voted to continue to require the skull and crossbones symbol.

Gallery

See also

References

External links 

 

Cross symbols
Warning systems
Heraldic charges
Personifications of death
Pictograms
Visual motifs